"Show Out" is a song by American hip hop recording artist Juicy J. It was released on January 25, 2013, as the second single from his third studio album Stay Trippy (2013). The song, produced by Mike WiLL Made It and co-produced by J-Bo, features guest appearances from Big Sean and Young Jeezy. The song has peaked at number 75 on the US Billboard Hot 100.

Background
The song premiered on November 30, 2012.

Music video
The music video for "Show Out" was filmed on January 25, 2013, and was directed by Juicy J and Frank Paladino. On March 7, 2013, the music video for "Show Out" featuring Young Jeezy and Big Sean premiered on 106 & Park, with cameo appearances from Berner, Chevy Woods, Roscoe Dash, Mike WiLL Made It, and DJ Drama.

Remix
The official remix was released on April 24, 2013, featuring verses from rappers T.I. and the late Pimp C.

Track listing

 Digital single

Charts

Weekly charts

Year-end charts

Release history

References

2012 songs
2013 singles
Big Sean songs
Juicy J songs
Kemosabe Records singles
Song recordings produced by Mike Will Made It
Songs written by Juicy J
Songs written by Jeezy
Songs written by Big Sean
Songs written by Mike Will Made It
Jeezy songs